Clarendon is a borough in Warren County, Pennsylvania, United States. The population was 450 at the 2010 census.

Geography
Clarendon is located at  (41.781091, -79.095090).

Demographics

As of the census of 2000, there were 564 people, 220 households, and 150 families residing in the borough. The population density was 1,308.6 people per square mile (506.4/km2). There were 239 housing units at an average density of 554.5 per square mile (214.6/km2). The racial makeup of the borough was 97.52% White, 0.18% Native American, 1.06% Asian, and 1.24% from two or more races. Hispanic or Latino of any race were 1.06% of the population.

There were 220 households, out of which 32.7% had children under the age of 18 living with them, 55.9% were married couples living together, 8.6% had a female householder with no husband present, and 31.8% were non-families. 26.8% of all households were made up of individuals, and 15.5% had someone living alone who was 65 years of age or older. The average household size was 2.56 and the average family size was 3.10.

In the borough the population was spread out, with 27.1% under the age of 18, 8.5% from 18 to 24, 26.4% from 25 to 44, 20.9% from 45 to 64, and 17.0% who were 65 years of age or older. The median age was 36 years. For every 100 females there were 98.6 males. For every 100 females age 18 and over, there were 97.6 males.

The median income for a household in the borough was $27,750, and the median income for a family was $30,313. Males had a median income of $29,083 versus $21,625 for females. The per capita income for the borough was $13,774. About 11.8% of families and 15.5% of the population were below the poverty line, including 23.9% of those under age 18 and 10.0% of those age 65 or over.

References

Boroughs in Warren County, Pennsylvania
Populated places established in 1872
1872 establishments in Pennsylvania